Mister Radio is a 1924 German silent drama film directed by Nunzio Malasomma and starring Luciano Albertini, Evi Eva and Magnus Stifter.

Cast
 Luciano Albertini as Gaston de Montfort 
 Evi Eva as Marion 
 Magnus Stifter as Joe Swalzen 
 Fred Immler as Girondin 
 Agnes Nero as Gräfin Jeanne de Montgort 
 Anna Gorilowa as Edy Duflos 
 Robert Scholz as  Industrieller 
 Angelo Rossi as Bergführer 
 Mario Fossati as Journalist 
 M. Leonhard as Apache

References

Bibliography
 Grange, William. Cultural Chronicle of the Weimar Republic. Scarecrow Press, 2008.

External links
 

1924 films
1924 drama films
Films of the Weimar Republic
German silent feature films
German drama films
Films directed by Nunzio Malasomma
German black-and-white films
Phoebus Film films
Silent drama films
1920s German films